Washington railway station served the village of Washington, Perth and Kinross, Scotland, from 1837 to 1847 on the Scottish Midland Junction Railway.

History 
The station opened on 24 February 1837 by the Newtyle and Coupar Angus Railway. It was short-lived, closing after 10 years on 8 September 1847 when the track was doubled.

References

External links 

Disused railway stations in Perth and Kinross
Railway stations in Great Britain opened in 1837
Railway stations in Great Britain closed in 1847
1837 establishments in Scotland
1847 disestablishments in Scotland